This article contains a list of current SNCF railway stations in the Normandy region of France.

Calvados (14)

 Audrieu
 Bayeux
 Blonville-sur-Mer-Benerville
 Bretteville-Norrey
 Caen
 Dives-Cabourg
 Dives-sur-Mer-Port Guillaume
 Frénouville-Cagny
 Le Grand-Jardin
 Houlgate
 Lisieux
 Lison
 Mézidon
 Le Molay-Littry
 Moult-Argences
 Pont-l'Évêque
 Saint-Pierre-sur-Dives
 Trouville-Deauville
 Villers-sur-Mer
 Vire

Eure (27)

 Beaumont-le-Roger
 Bernay
 La Bonneville-sur-Iton
 Bourgtheroulde-Thuit-Hébert
 Brionne
 Bueil
 Conches
 Évreux-Normandie
 Gaillon-Aubevoye
 Gisors
 Nonancourt
 Pont-de-l'Arche
 Romilly-la-Puthenaye
 Serquigny
 Val-de-Reuil
 Verneuil-sur-Avre
 Vernon–Giverny

Manche (50)

 Avranches
 Carentan
 Cherbourg
 Coutances
 Folligny
 Granville
 Pont-Hébert
 Pontorson-Mont-Saint-Michel
 Saint-Lô
 Valognes
 Villedieu-les-Poêles

Orne (61)

 L'Aigle
 Alençon
 Argentan
 Bretoncelles
 Briouze
 Condé-sur-Huisne
 Écouché
 Flers
 Sainte-Gauburge
 Sées
 Surdon
 Le Theil-La-Rouge

Seine-Maritime (76)

 Auffay
 Aumale
 Barentin
 Blangy-sur-Bresle
 Bréauté-Beuzeville
 Clères
 Dieppe
 Elbeuf-Saint-Aubin
 Épouville
 Étainhus-Saint-Romain
 Eu
 Fécamp
 Foucart-Alvimare
 Gournay-Ferrières
 Harfleur
 Harfleur (Halte)
 Le Havre
 Le Havre-Graville
 Jacques-Monod-la-Demi-Lieue
 Longroy-Gamaches
 Longuerue-Vieux-Manoir
 Longueville-sur-Scie
 Malaunay-Le Houlme
 Maromme
 Montérolier-Buchy
 Montivilliers
 Montville
 Morgny
 Motteville
 Oissel
 Pavilly
 Rolleville
 Rouen-Rive-Droite
 Saint-Aubin-sur-Scie
 Saint-Étienne-du-Rouvray
 Saint-Laurent-Gainneville
 Saint-Victor
 Serqueux
 Sommery
 Sotteville-lès-Rouen
 Tourville
 Le Tréport-Mers
 Yvetot

See also
 SNCF 
 List of SNCF stations for SNCF stations in other regions

Normandy